Thelma is romantic novel by the British writer Marie Corelli, first published in 1887. It portrays the relationship between Thelma, a Norwegian woman, and the Englishman Sir Phillip Errington. A popular success it ran to more than fifty six editions.

Summary
Sir Philip Bruce-Errington (30) meets the beautiful, honest Thelma Guldmar (19) in Norway. Aided by his friend Lorimer(26), Philip and Thelma confess their love and marry with her father (Olaf)'s blessing. The antagonists here are the lustful Reverend Dyceworthy and Lovisa Elsland, an old  lady who once loved Thelma's father.

Thelma and her loyal maid Britta are popular in London, but Thelma's beauty evokes widespread resentment, especially from her "friend" Lady Clara Winsleigh. Lady Winsleigh and the lustful Sir Francis Lennox convince Thelma that Philip loves the actress Violet Vere. Thelma leaves Philip and returns to Norway, but her father dies.

Philip goes to Norway and reconciles with Thelma. They have a daughter (who is exactly like her mother) and a son. Lorimer, who has always been a silent admirer of Thelma, marries Thelma's daughter. Britta marries Philip's Parisian friend Pierre Duprez.

Adaptations

The novel was adapted into silent films several times including the British Thelma (1918) and American Thelma (1922).

References

Bibliography
 Goble, Alan. The Complete Index to Literary Sources in Film. Walter de Gruyter, 1999.

External links
 

1887 British novels
Novels by Marie Corelli
British romance novels
British novels adapted into films